Scopula acyma is a moth of the family Geometridae. It was described by Prout in 1932. It is endemic to Kenya.

References

Endemic moths of Kenya
Moths described in 1932
acyma
Endemic fauna of Kenya
Taxa named by Louis Beethoven Prout
Moths of Africa